Carlton W. Faulkner (June 7, 1904 – January 28, 1967) was an American sound engineer. He won an Oscar in the category Sound Recording for the film The King and I. He was also nominated for four more Academy Awards, three in the same category and the fourth for Best Effects, Special Effects.

Selected filmography
Faulkner won an Academy Award and was nominated for three more:

Won
 The King and I (1956)

Nominated
 Love Is a Many-Splendored Thing (1955)
 The Young Lions (1958)
 Journey to the Center of the Earth (1959) (Best Sound and Best Effects)

References

External links

1904 births
1967 deaths
American audio engineers
Best Sound Mixing Academy Award winners
Engineers from California
20th-century American engineers
Academy Award for Technical Achievement winners